Blu celeste may refer to:
 Blu celeste (album), a 2021 album by Italian singer Blanco
 "Blu celeste" (song), the album's title track
 Bleu celeste, a tincture in heraldry